St. Andrew High School was a coeducational Catholic high school located at Cecil and McGraw streets in Detroit, Michigan, United States and belonged to the Roman Catholic Archdiocese of Detroit.  The school was run by the Felician Sisters.

St. Andrew was a member of the Michigan High School Athletic Association and competed athletically in the Catholic High School League.

St. Andrew High School closed in 1983.

Athletics
The Flyers won back-to-back boys basketball state championships in 1951 and 1952.

Notable alumni
Francis R. Reiss (1957), Roman Catholic Bishop
Frank Tanana, Sr. (1952), professional baseball player.

References

High schools in Detroit
Defunct Catholic secondary schools in Michigan
Roman Catholic Archdiocese of Detroit